Events from the year 2006 in Kuwait.

Incumbents
Emir: 
 until 15 January: Jaber Al-Ahmad Al-Jaber Al-Sabah
 15–24 January: Saad Al-Salim Al-Sabah 
 24–29 January: Vacant
 starting 29 January: Sabah Al-Ahmad Al-Jaber Al-Sabah 
Prime Minister: Sabah Al-Ahmad Al-Jaber Al-Sabah (until 30 January), Nasser Al-Sabah (starting 7 February)

Events

 February - Nasser Mohammed Al-Ahmed Al-Sabah became the Prime minister.

References

 
Kuwait
Kuwait
Years of the 21st century in Kuwait
2000s in Kuwait